This article displays the rosters for the participating teams at the 2006 FIBA Africa Club Championship.

Abidjan Basket Club

Africa Sports

BACK

Dodan Warriors

ESPN / AND 1

Inter Club Brazzaville

KCB Lions

B.C. Onatra

Petro Atlético

Plateau Peaks

Primeiro de Agosto

Zenith BC

References

External links
 2006 FIBA Africa Champions Cup Participating Teams

FIBA Africa Clubs Champions Cup squads
Basketball teams in Africa
FIBA